Gabriel's Fire is an American crime drama television series created by Donald R. Boyle, Coleman Luck and Jacqueline Zambrano that ran on ABC from September 12, 1990, to June 6, 1991, in the United States during the 1990–91 television season. A revamped version of the series, entitled Pros and Cons, aired briefly the following season.

Overview
The main character, Gabriel Bird, was played by James Earl Jones. He was a former Chicago police officer who, over twenty years prior, had been wrongfully sentenced to life imprisonment for the murder of a fellow police officer. In fact, he shot the officer to protect a defenseless mother and child whom the officer was about to murder in cold blood during a 1969 police raid. Unbeknownst to Bird, the raid had been merely a pretext for the police to attack the members of a militant black nationalist organization.

This incident in the character's background was inspired by the 1969 death of Black Panther Party leader Fred Hampton, who was shot and killed during a raid upon his residence conducted by Chicago police and other law enforcement personnel.  On the show, the street on which the raid involving Bird had occurred was identified as "Hampton Street".

After serving about twenty years in prison, a human rights lawyer decides to work for his release as his testimony is needed in another case. At first, Bird opposes any attempts to release him, as he became accustomed to life in prison, but after his release takes place against his will, he begins to get used to life as a free person and uses his time away from prison to help other people who are wronged by society or the authorities.

When Bird is released, he starts working as a private detective, hired by the lawyer who had helped free him.

Pros and Cons

Pros and Cons ran on ABC from September 26, 1991, to January 2, 1992, in the United States during the 1991–92 television season. It is a revamped, more lighthearted version of Gabriel's Fire. Jones and Sinclair reprised their roles as Gabriel and Josephine.

Characters
James Earl Jones as Gabriel Bird
Laila Robins as Victoria Heller
Brian K. Grant as Jamil Duke
Dylan Walsh as Louis Klein
Madge Sinclair as 	"Empress" Josephine Austin

Episodes

Awards
James Earl Jones
Emmy Award for Outstanding Lead Actor in a Drama Series (1991)
Image Award for Outstanding Lead Actor in a Drama Series, Mini-Series or Television Movie (1993)
Madge Sinclair
Emmy Award for Outstanding Supporting Actress in a Drama Series  (1991)
David Opatoshu
Emmy Award for Outstanding Guest Actor in a Drama Series (1991); playing Max Goldstein in the episode "A Prayer for the Goldsteins"

References

Brooks, Tim and Marsh, Earle. The Complete Directory to Prime Time Network and Cable TV Shows

External links
 

Television series by Lorimar Television
American Broadcasting Company original programming
1990s American crime drama television series
1990 American television series debuts
1991 American television series endings
American detective television series
Primetime Emmy Award-winning television series
Television shows set in Chicago